Vaishali ki Nagarvadhu (Hindi:वैशाली की नगरवधू) (literally, Nagar Vadhu or royal city bride/courtesan of Vaishali) is a two-part Hindi novel by Acharya Chatursen Shastri, published in 1948-49. It is a biographical novel which showcases the lustful nature of society as well as other aspects of culture and history of early Buddhist era India.  

It tells the story of Āmrapālī, also known as "Ambapālika" or "Ambapali", a celebrated nagarvadhu (royal courtesan) of the Republic of Vaishali in ancient India around 500 BC. Following the Buddha's teachings, she became an arahant.

Hindi-language novels
1948 novels
Indian novels adapted into films
Indian historical novels
Works about the Maurya Empire
Novels set in the 3rd century BC
Rajkamal Prakashan books
1948 Indian novels